Al Mansour Bani Wahb is a sub-district located in As Sawadiyah District, Al Bayda Governorate, Yemen. Al Mansour Bani Wahb had a population of 6975 according to the 2004 census.

References 

Sub-districts in As Sawadiyah District